The International Chamber Choir Competition Marktoberdorf is a competition for chamber choirs held every two years in Marktoberdorf, near Munich in southern Germany.

Founded in 1989, the 14th competition was held 22–27 May 2015. In the first 13 competitions, nearly 200 choirs from more than 40 countries participated.

References

1989 establishments in West Germany
Recurring events established in 1989
Biennial events
Competitions in West Germany
Music competitions in Germany
Music in Bavaria
Singing competitions
International Chamber Choir Competition Marktoberdorf